Moonchild is the 1997 debut album of Irish folk rock band Celtus, led by the McManus brothers Pat and John. The album is dedicated to their brother Tommy of the Mama's Boys who appears in previously unused recording footage on two tracks. Celtus performed tracks from the album opening for Sheryl Crow at three U.K. dates of her 1997 tour including the Royal Albert Hall show.

Track listing
 Strange Day in the Country
 Moonchild
 Every Step of the Way
 Some Kind of Wonder
 Brother's Lament
 Beyond the Dark
 Love Turns to Dust
 Rosa-Ree
 The Pilgrim
 Trikuti
 We Two Are One

References

1997 albums